The East Broad Street Historic District encompasses a city block of historic commercial buildings in Texarkana, Arkansas.  The district includes all of the buildings on the 100 block of East Broad Street.  Most of the fifteen buildings in the district were built before 1920, during Texarkana's major period of growth after the arrival of the railroad.  Broad Street, just one block from the railroad, quickly became its economic center.  The oldest building is the O'Dwyer and Ahern Building at 110 East Broad Street, a three-story brick-faced building constructed c. 1886.

The district was listed on the National Register of Historic Places in 2008.

See also
National Register of Historic Places listings in Miller County, Arkansas

References

Texarkana, Arkansas
Italianate architecture in Arkansas
Buildings designated early commercial in the National Register of Historic Places in Arkansas
Buildings and structures completed in 1886
Historic districts on the National Register of Historic Places in Arkansas
National Register of Historic Places in Miller County, Arkansas